A  is a seafood dish of raw and cooked shellfish served cold on a platter, usually on a bed of ice.

A plateau de fruits de mer generally consists entirely of shellfish and is served with condiments such as mignonette sauce, cocktail sauce, and lemon.

Service

The serving platter is often held above table level by a stand, and sometimes can contain multiple, elaborate tiers. This is both for visual effect, and because the shellfish are often served in the shell, or on the half shell, which causes them to take up a large area while containing only a bite or two of meat. It can alternatively be served on a bed of seaweed (vraic).

Shellfish
A plateau de fruits de mer may include:

Oysters
Shrimp
Lobster
Periwinkle
Crab
Prawns
Langoustine
Mussels
Scallops
Clams

See also

 List of seafood dishes
 List of fish dishes
 Raw bar

Notes and references 

Seafood dishes